Manuel Salazar (born 25 July 1956, Caucagua, Miranda, Venezuela) is Venezuelan actor. Salazar is internationally known from his role as the nice police, Salvador, in Coral telenovela Juana la virgen.

Filmography

TV series 
 De todas maneras Rosa (2013)
 Estrambótica Anastasia (2004)
 La Invasora (2003)
 Mi gorda bella (2002)
 Juana la virgen (2002)
 Carissima (2001)
 Mis 3 hermanas (2000)
 Mariú (2000)
 Luisa Fernanda (1999)
 Reina de Corazones (1998)
 Cambio de Piel (1998)
 Las Dos Dianas (1992)
 Piel (1992)
 Emperatriz (1990)

Movies 
 Manuela Sáenz (2000)
 100 años de perdón / Little Thieves, Big Thieves (1998)
 Desnudo con naranjas / Nude with Oranges (1994)

References 
 

20th-century Venezuelan male actors
People from Miranda (state)
1956 births
Living people
21st-century Venezuelan male actors
Venezuelan male film actors
Venezuelan male telenovela actors